= 29th Signal Battalion (United States) =

National Guard unit of the US Army

- Coat of Arms of the 29th Signal Battalion
- Active: 1942-1963 1983-present
- Country: United States
- Branch: U.S. Army
- Motto(s): "Clear and Open"
- Battle honours: World War II: Normandy; Northern France; Rhineland; Ardennes-Alsace; Central Europe

The 29th Signal Battalion is a battalion of the US Army formed on 20 March 1942 as the 29th Signal Construction Battalion and activated on 10 April 1942 at Camp Gordon, Georgia. The unit served under federal control during WWII, and was allotted to the regular army in 1950, serving in Germany and France during the Cold War. The unit is tasked with installing, operating and maintaining a communications systems.

== Lineage ==
The unit was constituted 20 March 1942 in the Army of the United States as the 29th Signal Construction Battalion and activated 10 April 1942 at Camp Gordon, Georgia. Later being redesignated on 14 May 1945 as the 29th Signal Light Construction Battalion. Reorganized and redesignated 15 August 1949 as the 29th Signal Construction Battalion. it was Allotted on 31 October 1950 to the Regular Army. Being once again reorganized and redesignated on 20 October 1953 as the 29th Signal Battalion. Inactivated 12 August 1963 in France. Activated 1 May 1983 at Fort Lewis, Washington. Later being assigned to the 142nd Signal Brigade in September 1999.

== Campaign participation credit ==
World War II:

- Normandy
- Northern France
- Rhineland
- Ardennes-Alsace
- Central Europe
